Piedra is a hair disease.

Piedra (Spanish for "rock") may also refer to:

Piedra (Spain), a tributary of the river Jalón
Piedra, California, a community in the US
Piedra River (Colorado), a tributary of the San Juan River, US
Piedra (Mexican cuisine), a stuffed corn dumpling

See also
Piedra Blanca, a city in the Dominican Republic
Piedras Blancas, a town in Asturias, Spain
Piedras Blancas Light, a lighthouse in California
Piedra del Águila Dam, in Patagonia, Argentina
Piedras Negras, Coahuila, a city in Mexico
Piedras Negras (Maya site), an archaeological site in Guatemala
Piedra Guadalupe, a rock in the Farallon Islands, California, US